Bazikovo (Baźıq) is a rural locality (a village) in Burunovsky Selsoviet, Gafuriysky District, Bashkortostan, Russia. The population was 206 as of 2010. There are 6 streets.

Geography 
Bazikovo is located 35 km southwest of Krasnousolsky (the district's administrative centre) by road. Burunovka is the nearest rural locality.

References 

Rural localities in Gafuriysky District